This is a list of bridges and other crossings of the Delaware River from the Atlantic Ocean upstream to its source(s).

Crossings

See also
 George Washington's crossing of the Delaware River

References

External links

Delaware River
Delaware River
Delaware River
Delaware River
Delaware River
Crossings of the Delaware River
D
Delaware River
D